Voice of Tibet may refer to:

 Voice of Tibet (Norway)
 Voice of Tibet (China)